Rah Band-e Olya (also Romanized as Rāh Band-e ‘Olyā and Rāband-e ‘Olyā; also known as Rāh Band, Rāh Bīd, Rauband, Rūband, and Rāband) is a village in Hemmatabad Rural District, in the Central District of Borujerd County, Lorestan Province, Iran. At the 2006 census, its population was 53, in 12 families.

References 

Towns and villages in Borujerd County